"Ólavur Riddararós" is a song by Faroese folk / Viking metal band Týr, released as a single in October 2002 by Tutl. The song is an adaptation of the Faroese ballad of the same name, a variant of the Elveskud ballad. 

This is the only Týr release to feature Allan Streymoy's vocals, who joined the band after Pól Arni Holm's departure. The band considers, in retrospect, Streymoy's hiring and the single's release to be a "rash decision".

Track listing

Personnel
 Allan Streymoy – vocals
 Terji Skibenæs – guitar
 Heri Joensen – guitar
 Gunnar H. Thomsen – bass
 Kári Streymoy – drums

Production
 Mastered by Steen Svare and Jens Rud
 Mixed by Steen Svare and Jens Rud
 Recorded by Steen Svare and Jens Rud

References

2002 singles
Faroese music
Týr (band) songs
Year of song unknown
Songwriter unknown